San Alfredo is a district in the department of Concepción, Paraguay.

References 

Populated places in Concepción Department, Paraguay